Billy Barty (born William John Bertanzetti, October 25, 1924 – December 23, 2000) was an American actor and activist. Because of his short stature, he was often cast in films opposite taller performers for comic effect. He specialized in outspoken or wisecracking characters. During the 1950s, he became a television actor, appearing regularly in the Spike Jones ensemble. In the early 1970s he was a staple in a variety of roles in children's TV programs produced by Sid and Marty Krofft. Also an activist for people with dwarfism, he founded the Little People of America organization in 1957.

Early life
Barty was born October 25, 1924, in Millsboro, Pennsylvania, the son of Albert Steven and Ellen Cecial Bertanzetti. His paternal grandfather was Italian. The family moved to California in 1927. He had two sisters, Delores and Evelyn.

Career
Barty co-starred with Mickey Rooney in the Mickey McGuire shorts, a comedy series of the 1920s and 1930s based on the Toonerville Folks comics. Small for his age even then, Barty would impersonate very young children alongside brawny authority figures or wild animals, making these threats seem even larger by comparison.

In the 1933 film Gold Diggers of 1933, a nine-year-old Barty appeared as a baby who escapes from his stroller. He also appeared as The Child in the 1933 film Footlight Parade. He is briefly seen in the 1935 film Bride of Frankenstein, in an uncredited role as a baby in one of Dr. Pretorius' experiments, although his close-ups were cut out of the picture.

Much of Barty's film work consisted of bit parts and gag roles. He appeared in Fireman Save My Child (with Spike Jones), and also appeared in two Elvis Presley films, Roustabout (in one scene) and Harum Scarum, as a co-star without dialogue.
However, some of his more substantial film roles were as the High Aldwin, the village elder, in Willow alongside Warwick Davis, creator of the cosmic key, Gwildor in the 1987 cult classic film Masters of the Universe, and as cameraman Noodles MacIntosh in "Weird Al" Yankovic's UHF.

Television
Barty appeared several times on The Dennis Day Show, including once as a leprechaun. Beginning in 1958, he played pool hustler Babby, an occasional "information resource", in eight episodes of the Peter Gunn TV series. Barty starred in the Rawhide episode "Prairie Elephant" in 1961.

Barty also starred in a local Southern California children's show, Billy Barty's Bigtop, in the mid-1960s, which regularly showed The Three Stooges shorts. In one program, Stooge Moe Howard visited the set as a surprise guest. The program gave many Los Angeles area children their first opportunity to become familiar with little people, who until then had been rarely seen on the screen except as two-dimensional curiosities. He also appeared as a guest host on KTTV's Sheriff John's Lunch Brigade whenever "Sheriff John" Rovick was on vacation. Barty also made regular appearances on The Red Skelton Hour during the mid-1960s.

Barty starred in full-body costumes in two children's television shows produced by Sid and Marty Krofft: as "Sparky the Firefly" in The Bugaloos from 1970 to 1972, and as "Sigmund" in Sigmund and the Sea Monsters from 1974 to 1976. Out of costume, he played the evil sidekick on the Kroffts' Dr. Shrinker from 1976 to 1977. Meanwhile, he played Toulouse Lautrec in the 1972 The Brady Bunch Saturday morning cartoons preview special The Brady Bunch Meet ABC's Saturday Superstars.

He was a regular cast member of comedian Redd Foxx's variety show The Redd Foxx Show. Barty appeared in an episode of Barney Miller in 1977, and an episode of The Love Boat in 1978. Another show he guest-starred in was CHiPs. In June 1978, Barty guest-starred in the final episode of Man from Atlantis titled "Deadly Carnival". He also guest starred in two episodes of Little House on the Prairie playing a circus member in the episode "Annabelle". Also in a later episode ("Little Lou") as a single father trying to raise a baby daughter. Barty was regularly seen on Bizarre, a weekly Canadian TV sketch comedy series, airing from 1980 to 1985. In 1981, he appeared in a documentary called Being Different and in late 1985, he appeared as Rose Nylund's father in a dream sequence on an episode of The Golden Girls titled "A Little Romance".

In 1982, Barty appeared in an episode of Hart to Hart called "A Christmas Hart" (Season 4, Episode 10).

In 1983, Barty supplied the voice for "Figment" in EPCOT Center's Journey Into Imagination dark ride. He subsequently supplied a reprisal for the second incarnation, though very brief.

Barty was an annual guest-star on Canada's Telemiracle telethon, one of the most successful (per capita) telethons in the world.

Barty appeared on a 1976 episode of Celebrity Bowling paired with Dick Martin, defeating John Schuck and Michael Ansara, 120–118. He also appeared as himself in the 1981 documentary film Being Different.

Activism

Barty was a noted activist for the promotion of rights for others with dwarfism. He was disappointed with contemporary Hervé Villechaize's insistence that they were "midgets" instead of actors with dwarfism. Barty founded the Little People of America organization to help people with dwarfism in 1957 when he called upon people of short stature to join him in a get-together in Reno, Nevada. That original meeting of 21 people grew into Little People of America, a group which as of 2010 has more than 6,800 members. It was the first North American organization for little people.

Other
In 1981, Barty received a motion pictures star on the Hollywood Walk of Fame at 6922 Hollywood Boulevard for his contributions to the film industry.

In 1990, Barty was sued in small claims court by two of the writers of his cancelled comedy television series Short Ribbs, which aired for 13 weeks in the autumn of 1989 as a local program on KDOC-TV. Producer and writer William Winckler and writer Warren Taylor filed separate lawsuits against Barty for money owed, and Barty lost both cases. Barty claimed the lawsuit news was the most publicity he ever got, and compared it to similar press that celebrity Zsa Zsa Gabor received for slapping a Beverly Hills police officer.

A tribute book on Barty's life was published in December 2002. Within Reach: An Inspirational Journey into the Life, Legacy and Influence of Billy Barty was produced by Barty's nephew, Michael Copeland, and Copeland's wife, Debra.

In the 1980s he owned a popular roller rink in Fullerton, California, that also booked bands on weekends.

Personal life
In 1962, he married Shirley Bolingbroke of Malad City, Idaho. They had two children, Lori Neilson and TV/film producer and director Braden Barty.

Barty and his family were members of the Church of Jesus Christ of Latter-day Saints.

Death
Barty died of heart failure in 2000 at age 76. He is entombed in Glendale's Forest Lawn Memorial Park Cemetery.

Filmography

Soup to Nuts (1930) as Junior (uncredited)
Daddy Long Legs (1931) as Billy – Orphan (uncredited)
Monkey Business (1931) (uncredited)
Over the Hill (1931) as Shelby Boy (uncredited)
Out All Night (1933) as Child
Gold Diggers of 1933 (1933) as Baby in "Pettin' in the Park" Number (uncredited)
Footlight Parade (1933) as Mouse / Little Boy (uncredited)
Roman Scandals (1933) as Little Eddie (uncredited)
Alice in Wonderland (1933) as White Pawn / The Baby (uncredited)
Bride of Frankenstein (1935) as Baby (uncredited)
A Midsummer Night's Dream (1935) as Mustard-Seed 
Nothing Sacred (1937) as Boy Biting Wally's Ankle (uncredited)
Three Wise Fools (1946) as Bit (uncredited)
Pygmy Island (1950) as Kimba (uncredited)
The Clown (1953) as Billy – Coney Island Midget (uncredited)
Fireman Save My Child (1954) as Clarinetist inside tuba (uncredited)
The Undead (1957) as The Imp
The Wonderful World of the Brothers Grimm (1962) as The Court Jester (uncredited)
Roustabout (1964) as Billy (uncredited)
Harum Scarum (1965) as Baba
The Perils of Pauline (1967) as Pygmy Leader (uncredited)
Pufnstuf (1970) as Googy Gopher / Orville Pelican
The Day of the Locust (1975) as Abe Kusich
The Godmothers (1975) as The Hawk
Sixpack Annie (1975) as Pie Vendor (uncredited)
W.C. Fields and Me (1976) as Ludwig
Won Ton Ton, the Dog Who Saved Hollywood (1976) as Assistant Director
The Amazing Dobermans (1976) as Samson
Dr. Shrinker (1976) as Hugo
The Happy Hooker Goes to Washington (1977) as Little Man
Rabbit Test (1978) as Lester
Foul Play (1978) as J.J. MacKuen
The Lord of the Rings (1978, rotoscope footage) as Bilbo Baggins and Samwise Gamgee
Love Boat (1978)
Firepower (1979) as Dominic Carbone
Skatetown, U.S.A. (1979) as Jimmy
Hardly Working (1980) as Sammy
Under the Rainbow (1981) as Otto Kriegling
Night Patrol (1984) as Captain Lewis
Legend (1985) as Screwball
Tough Guys (1986) as Philly
Body Slam (1987) as Tim McClusky
Rumpelstiltskin (1987) as Rumpelstiltskin
Snow White (1987) as Iddy
Masters of the Universe (1987) as Gwildor
Off the Mark (1987) as The Little Russian
Willow (1988) as The High Aldwin
UHF (1989) as Noodles
The Rescuers Down Under (1990) as Baitmouse (voice)
Wishful Thinking (1990) as Gypsy
Diggin' Up Business (1990) as Crosby
Life Stinks (1991) as Willy
The Naked Truth (1992) as The Bell Boy
Outlaws: The Legend of O.B. Taggart (1994)
Radioland Murders (1994) as himself
An Alan Smithee Film: Burn Hollywood Burn (1998) as himself
L.A. Heat (1999) as Morty Feinberg
The Extreme Adventures of Super Dave (2000) as Funeral Eulogist (uncredited) 
I/O Error (2001) as Custodian (Final film role)

Notes

References

External links

 
 
 
 
  
 
 
 
 
 

1924 births
2000 deaths
Male actors from Pennsylvania
Actors with dwarfism
American male child actors
Latter Day Saints from Pennsylvania
American people of Italian descent
American male voice actors
California State University, Los Angeles alumni
Burials at Forest Lawn Memorial Park (Glendale)
Los Angeles City College alumni
20th-century American male actors
Vaudeville performers
Latter Day Saints from California
Latter Day Saints from Idaho